Yannick Bertrand (born 18 August 1980 in Thonon-les-Bains) is a French alpine skier who competed in the 2006 Winter Olympics. He placed 24th in both the men's Downhill and Super-G events.

References

External links
 sports-reference.com

1980 births
Living people
French male alpine skiers
Olympic alpine skiers of France
Alpine skiers at the 2006 Winter Olympics
People from Thonon-les-Bains
Sportspeople from Haute-Savoie
21st-century French people